Norwood Municipal Building is a registered historic building in Norwood, Ohio, listed in the National Register on March 11, 1980. It was designed by architect, John Scudder Adkins.

Historic uses 
City Hall

Notes 

City and town halls on the National Register of Historic Places in Ohio
National Register of Historic Places in Hamilton County, Ohio
Norwood, Ohio
City and town halls in Ohio